Billups Branch is a stream in the U.S. states of Iowa and Missouri. It is a tributary of the North Wyaconda River.

Billups Branch has the name of Joseph Billups, an early settler.

See also
List of rivers of Iowa
List of rivers of Missouri

References

Rivers of Davis County, Iowa
Rivers of Van Buren County, Iowa
Rivers of Scotland County, Missouri
Rivers of Iowa
Rivers of Missouri